The Syracuse Baseball Wall of Fame was established by the Syracuse SkyChiefs in 1998 in conjunction with the 140th anniversary of the first organized baseball team in Syracuse, New York. It is located at NBT Bank Stadium, home of the Syracuse Mets Triple-A baseball team, in the stadiums' Hall of Fame, which is located under the Metropolitan Club.

Categories 

The categories for induction are:

 First 75 years of professional baseball (1858–1933)
 Former Chiefs/SkyChiefs player (1934–present)
 Professional baseball player or person affiliated with professional baseball
 Contributor to the game of baseball.

Through the 2012 season, the Syracuse Baseball Wall of Fame Committee included Ron Gersbacher, John Simone, Tex Simone, Bob Snyder, and Tom Leo.

List of awardees 

 1998: Grover Cleveland Alexander, Red Barrett, Bill Dinneen, Dave Giusti, Mack Jones, Hank Sauer
 1999: Jim Bottomley, Rob Gardner, Bill Kelly, Dutch Mele, Jimmy Outlaw, Lawrence Skiddy, Frank Verdi
 2000: Jack Corbett, Jewel Ens, Tom Henke, Willie Horton, Bob Shawkey, Ed Shokes, Hooks Wiltse
 2001: Len Boehmer, Johnny Gee, Dave Lemanczyk, Frank McCormick, Jim Northrup, Frank Schulte, Tex Simone
 2002: Rick Bladt, Wally Cazen, Frank DiPino, Mike Dorgan, Anthony Henninger, Dixie Howell, Jim Walsh
 2003: Mike Barlow, Dave Bergman, Tony Fernández, Sandy Griffin, Henry McCormick, Red Parton, Goody Rosen
 2004: Mike Bragman, Dutch Dotterer, Howard Ehmke, Jack Fifield, Carden Gillenwater, Mickey Klutts, Willie Smith
 2005: Dom Dallessandro, John Harmon, John Johnstone, Pepper Martin, Thurman Munson, Jim Owens, Vic Willis
 2006: Alan Closter, Steve Grilli, Tom Higgins, Bob Keegan, Conny Murphy, Doc Scanlan, Frank Tepedino
 2007: Dutch Dotterer, Jr., Ron Guidry, Fred McGriff, Dick Rockwell, Specs Toporcer, Otto Vélez
 2008: Bobby Cox, Pat Gillick, Ted Kleinhans, Vic Power, Tommy Thevenow, Greg "Boomer" Wells, Terry Whitfield
 2009: Cupid Childs, Babe Dahlgren, William Hofmann, Sr., Rick Leach, Gino Petralli, Jon Ratliff, Randy St. Claire
 2010: Shawn Green, Earl Harrist, Chris Jones, Dick Ryan, Mickey Stanley, Don Waful
 2011: Jerry Brooks, Lou Johnson, Joseph Kren, Gene Locklear, Gus Mancuso, Jim Prendergast
 2012: Dan Clark, Carlos Delgado, Scott McGregor, Stu Pederson, Frank Riccelli, Philip S. Ryder
 2013: Tomy de la Cruz, Bob Dustal, Don Gordon, Chick Hafey, Mal Mallette, Robert Perez 
 2016: Chad Mottola, Anton "Tony" Kreuzer, James "Jimmy" Durkin, Joel Mareiniss
 2017: Sean McDonough, Tom Dotterer, Frank Calo, Jhonatan Solano
 2018: Roy Halladay, Lew Carr, Tom Leo, Butch Alberts
 2019: Ed Kranepool, Don Labbruzzo, Herm Card
 2020/2021: Jason Grilli, Bob Southworth, Jack Morse, Danny Cavallo (2020 season cancelled, induction held in 2021)
 2022: Phil Regan, Moses Fleetwood Walker, Mark Lukasiewicz, Dom Cambareri

See also 
 Baseball Hall of Fame (Cooperstown, New York)
 Sports in Syracuse

References

External links
 Gersbacher, Ron. (2012). "History of Syracuse Baseball, 1858 to Present"
 Gene Locklear website

Wall of Fame
Baseball in Syracuse, New York
Baseball museums and halls of fame
1998 establishments in New York (state)
Awards established in 1998
Halls of fame in New York (state)
Museums in Syracuse, New York